Raggatt Mountains is a group of peaks westward from the Scott Mountains, lying east of Rayner Glacier and north of Thyer Glacier. Delineated by ANARE (Australian National Antarctic Research Expeditions) from air photos taken by RAAF Antarctic Flight of 1956. Named by Antarctic Names Committee of Australia (ANCA) for Dr. H.G. Raggatt, Secretary of the Australian Dept. of National Development.

Features
Geographical features include:

 Dick Peaks
 Geoffrey Hills
 Mount Bergin
 Mount Dyke
 Mount Humble
 Mount Maslen
 Mount Merrick
 Thyer Glacier

Mountain ranges of Enderby Land